The purple shore crab (Hemigrapsus nudus) is a common crab of the family Varunidae. It can be found sheltering under rocks in inter-tidal areas along the west coast of North America, from Alaska to Baja California in Mexico. This crab primarily eats sea lettuce and other green algae, and occasionally scavenges dead animals.

Description
Its dorsal shell (carapace) is generally a dark purple in color, although it may be olive green or red, with white or cream markings. The color of the legs matches the color of the carapace but the white-tipped claws (chelipeds) are a lighter color with purple or red spots – these spots allow H. nudus to be distinguished from a similar looking crab, the lined shore crab, Pachygrapsus crassipes, whose chelipeds lack spots. The legs of H. nudus lack setae, a distinguishing feature of the otherwise similar H. oregonensis.

References

External links

purple shore crab
Crustaceans of the eastern Pacific Ocean
Fauna of Alaska
Fauna of Western Canada
Fauna of the Western United States
Fauna of the Baja California Peninsula
Crustaceans described in 1851
Taxa named by James Dwight Dana